New Coast Hotel Manila is a hotel in Manila, Philippines.

History
New Coast Hotel Manila was formerly ran under the Hyatt hotel chain under the name Hyatt Regency Hotel & Casino Manila.

On January 1, 2015, New World Hotels took over the management of Hyatt Regency Manila and the hotel was rebranded as New World Manila Bay Hotel. In 2020, it adopted its current name, New Coast Hotel Manila.

Accreditation
As of 2019, the Department of Tourism accredits the hotel with a five-star rating under its National Accreditation Standards.

References

Hotels in Manila
Buildings and structures in Malate, Manila
Hyatt Hotels and Resorts